Samuel "Chuffie" Alexander (March 15, 1902 – September 22, 1989) was an American baseball outfielder in the Negro leagues. He played from 1925 to 1932 with several teams.

References

External links

 and Baseball-Reference Black Baseball Stats and  Seamheads

Birmingham Black Barons players
Monroe Monarchs players
1902 births
1989 deaths
20th-century African-American sportspeople
Baseball outfielders